Bindu Basini Govt. Boys' High School, commonly referred to as Bindu Basini Boys' or B. B. Boys' or BBB, is a public boys' secondary school in Tangail, Bangladesh. The school was established in 1880 as a minor school, patronized and endowed by Rani Bindubasini Chowdhurany (Zamindar of Santosh).

In 1970 the school became government funded and started to operate as double shift school in 1991. The school runs secondary (class 6–10) education for boys and students appear in Junior School Certificate (JSC) and Secondary School Certificate (SSC) examinations. School EIIN Number is 114680.

History
The school started operation on 3 April 1880 as a minor school. It is one of the oldest schools of Bangladesh. After a short while it was named as Graham English High School after the name of District Magistrate of Mymensingh Zilla. Then school authority sought and received financial help from Nawab Bahadur Syed Nawab Ali Chowdhury, then Zamindar of Dhanbari; he aided with operational costs for two years.

Bindu Basini Roy Chowdhurany, Zamindar of Santosh then aided the operation of the school and it was renamed to Bindubasini High School as recognition of her support. She carried the responsibility until she formed a trust in 1910 and handed over the responsibility to the Trust Board. After the death of Mrs Cowdhurany her sons Pramath Nath Roy Chowdhury and Sir Monmouth Nath Roy Chowdury patronized the school, they established facilities such as building, laboratory and library. After the Liberation War in Bangladesh, it transformed into a government boys' high school. In 1996 Bindu Basini Govt. Boys' High School, Tangail achieved the status of best high school in Bangladesh. Now, it's the best high school in Tangail. Now the school takes part in the competitions and wins in almost every item.

High schools in Bangladesh
Schools in Tangail District